Ontmaskerd  is a 1915 Dutch silent drama film directed by Mime Misu.

Cast
Annie Bos	 ... 	Marfa Darbet
Jack Hamel	... 	Henri d'Alba
Johannes Langenake	... 	Bob
Emmy Arbous	... 	Viola Sergrie
Coen Hissink	...   Theatre Agent
John Timrott		
Jan van Dommelen		
Eugenie Krix		
Jan Holtrop		
Rienk Brouwer	... Policeman
Carl Kuehn		
Alex Benno		
M.F. Heemskerk		
Ernst Leijden

External links 
 

1915 films
Dutch silent feature films
Dutch black-and-white films
1915 drama films
Dutch drama films
Silent drama films